Sonia Del Rio (born January 29, 1940) is a Spanish Classical Dancer. She is the daughter of Émile Boisvenu and Thérèse Jacques.

Biography
Sonia del Rio (Boisvenu) was born in Rouyn-Noranda, Quebec. The family settled in Montreal. As of the age of thirteen, she studied classical and Spanish dance at the Lucasse-Morenoff studio. His meeting with Jose Greco will be decisive. She undertakes studies in Spain with renowned teachers, such as Mercedes y Albano, Raquel Lucas, Azorin and Jose Granero. Her relentlessness at work earned him the only Canadian to obtain a diploma from Real Escuela Superior from Arte Dramato y Danza de Madrid.

Her undeniable talent is quickly noticed and she evolves in Europe with the prestigious companies Ballet by Pilar Lopez, Jose de la Vega (National Choreography Prize), Jose Greco, Mariemma, Pilar de Oro y Alfredo Gil, Rafael Aguilar and, finally, the Antonio ballet. She was also a soloist at the La Scala Opera Theater in Milan and danced for four years at the Le Châtelet Theater in Paris, with Luis Mariano. Back home, Mrs. Ludmilla Chiriaeff, founder of Les Grands Ballets Canadiens, asked her to join the École supérieure de danse du Québec. She held the positions of teacher and choreographer there for several years.

She has also shone as a choreographer and principal dancer with the Opéra de Montréal, the Orchester Symphonique de Montréal and the Orchester Symphonique de Québec. In 1975, she created the Sonia Del Rio School of Spanish and Flamenco Dance. In 1997, hired by Skate Canada, she collaborated on a Spanish choreography with gold medalist Paul Duchesnay for the Junior Figure Skating Team of Quebec. In the summer of the same year, she presented a concert at the Château de Dampierre-sur-Boutonne. The rave reviews from the press earned him a second invitation in July 2000.

Her ultimate award came on October 14, 1998, in the name of His Majesty King Juan Carlos of Spain, the Order of Isabella the Catholic, the highest distinction granted to a foreign artist. In August 1999, Sonia del Rio was named godmother of the Féria de Montréal at the Olympic stadium, in addition to being a dancer-choreographer of the Great Portuguese Corrida Taurine.

The year 2000 was flamboyant for Sonia del Rio. Among other things, she was invited to set a choreography at the Théâtre du Rideau Vert in Montreal, in a play by Ionesco. In March, she was appointed artistic director of the Muestra Cultural Ibero-latinoamericana in Montreal. On April 6 and 7, she danced Carmen, by Georges Bizet, with the Orchester Symphonique de la Montérégie.

In June, she dances The Spanish Caprice, by Rimsky-Korsakov, with the Orchester symphonique de Laval. In July and August, Sonia del Rio makes a European tour where she dances, in Barcelona, within the framework of a conference illustrated by the famous dancer Jose de La Vega, telling the career of the flamenco dance icon of the 20s and 30s, Vincente Escudero. Sonia del Rio embodies the role of the partner of the latter, Carmita Garcia.

A grant holder from the Conseil des arts et des lettres du Québec, Sonia del Rio returns to Spain to revitalize her art. Lucia Real and Merche Esmeralda will be her teachers. In the summer of 2001, Sonia del Rio bowed out in Spain, in Madrid, as a guest artist at the Coracera Castle Dance Festival on June 23, 2001, with the participation of the Canadian Embassy. She celebrates that evening, her forty years of artistic life. His professional debut dates back to 1961 with the famous Spanish ballet of Pilar Lopez.

Returning to Quebec, the grand lady of Flamenco opened a dance school in Trois-Rivières in September 2001. In the spring of 2002, at the request of actress Sophie Faucher, she performed a choreography for the theater play Apasionada, telling the story of the life of Frida Kahlo, directed by Robert Lepage. Between 2000 and 2010 Sonia del Rio divides her time between France, Spain and Quebec.

In 2008 Sonia del Rio danced at the International Festival of Montguyon in France. Also in 2008, as part of the 400th anniversary celebrations of the founding of Quebec City, she presented, accompanied by actress France Desjarlais and flautist Jean Dury, the evolution of ties between France and Quebec in through four hundred years of history.

Between 2005 and 2011, Sonia del Rio occupies the Quebec stages by presenting her conferences. Sonia del Rio illustrates by dancing the historical journey of this production entitled From Île d'Orléans to the Contrescarpe. The show gets great press reviews in France in Le Journal du Sud-Ouest. Flamenco lived, told and danced, by Sonia del Rio among others, at the "Belles Soirées" of the University of Montreal.

Anthology of Spanish Dance is presented at the Château Ramesay with guitarist Serge Beauchemin, at the Château Dufresne with Kristin Molnar on violin and Serge Beauchemin, and at the Chapelle Historique with pianist Marie-Andrée Ostiguy and actress Christine Lamer, without forgetting the musicians Caroline Plante, Dominique Soulard (guitarists) and the singer El Chele (Jose Lumbrera). The 7th Autumn Festival "Organs and Colors" invites Sonia del Rio, accompanied by the organist Régis Rousseau, to present dances from the Spanish Renaissance.*

The Montérégie Symphony Orchestra, under the direction of Marc David, presents the concert version of Georges Bizet's opera Carmen. The actor Edgar Fruitier tells the story written by Prosper Mérimée, Sonia del Rio dances some excerpts from the famous opera. Trois-Rivières, Terrebonne, Repentigny, Magog and Joliette applaud Sonia del Rio in various concerts.

In December 2010, Sonia Del Rio appeared in the art book El Flamenco que vivi written by José de la Vega. The only Canadian to appear in this book, she rubs shoulders with the greats: Antonio Gades, Ismael Galván, Merche Esmeralda and Maria Pages.

Awards
 1978 "Artist of the Year" prize awarded by the newspaper Le Soleil of the city of Chateauguay
 June 24, 1998: on the occasion of the National Day of Spain, Mrs. Sonia del Rio (Boisvenu) will be decorated IN THE NAME OF HIS MAJESTY KING JUAN CARLOS 1st (q.D.g.) of the Lazo de Dama de la Orden de Isabel la Católica, the highest distinction awarded to a foreign artist for her entire career and services rendered to Spain. Sonia del Rio will be ennobled with an honorary title under her civil status name (Iltma. SRA. Dama. Sonia Boisvenu) The Consul General of Spain in Montreal, Mr. Castroviejo, will have the honor of decorating Dame Sonia Boisvenu ( del Rio).
 November 29, 1998, the largest daily newspaper in French America, the newspaper La Presse, named Sonia del Rio "Personality of the week".
 1999: Sonia del Rio is named Godmother of the Feria de Montréal.
 2000: Sonia del Rio receives the prize from the Société du Patrimoine d’Expression du Québec (SPEQ) (Hélène-Baillargeon prize).
 2000: Journalists from the Spanish community of Montreal from La Voz newspaper named Sonia del Rio “Greater Montreal Artist of the Year”.
 2016: the Festuval Flamenco de Montréal pays tribute to Sonia del Rio at Théâtre Outremont. The mayor of Montreal, Mr. Denis Coderre, will be very proud to contribute to this festival which showcases the diversity of Montreal's culture, its richness and its creativity in the presence of the Consul General of Spain Don Antonio Bullon and his wife. Mr. Bullon will take the floor to honor Sonia del Rio.

References

External links
 https://www.ledevoir.com/culture/musique/479559/5e-festival-flamenco-de-montreal-hommage-a-sonia-del-rio-une-artiste-flamboyante [archive]
 https://discover.dcd.ca/items/16293 [archive]
 https://ici.radio-canada.ca/ohdio/premiere/emissions/region-zero-8/segments/entrevue/155996/sonia-del-rio-danseuse-flamenco-native-rouyn-noranda [archive]
 https://numerique.banq.qc.ca/patrimoine/details/52327/3334227 [archive]
 https://pierreturcotte/editeur [archive], Vivre ma vie et Danser, Sonia de Rio/Monique Khouzam-Gendron et Pascale Garber

1940 births
Living people
Spanish ballerinas
People from Rouyn-Noranda
Prima ballerinas
Principal dancers of The Royal Ballet
National Dance Award winners
Canadian people of French descent
21st-century ballet dancers
21st-century Spanish dancers